Jitka Dolejší (born 14 May 1958 in Prague) is a Czech former archer who competed in the 1980 Summer Olympic Games representing Czechoslovakia.

Olympics

She competed in the women's individual event at the 1980 Summer Olympic Games and finished twentieth with a score of 2219 points.

References

External links 
 Profile on worldarchery.org

1958 births
Czech female archers
Olympic archers of Czechoslovakia
Archers at the 1980 Summer Olympics
Living people
Sportspeople from Prague